The Offspring, a Southern California-based punk rock band, has released 10 studio albums, four extended plays (EP), two compilation albums, five demos, three video albums, and over 30 singles.

The Offspring were formed in 1983 under the name Manic Subsidal by singer/guitarist Dexter Holland and bassist Greg K., who later recruited Noodles as their guitarist. After Manic Subsidal changed its name to The Offspring in 1986, drummer Ron Welty finally joined in 1987, then the band recorded a demo a year later. The Offspring signed a record deal with short-lived label Nemesis Records, and released its first album, The Offspring, in 1989 on vinyl only. That album would not be released on CD until 1995. Two years later, after the release of the Baghdad EP and another demo, the band signed to Epitaph Records (a label owned by then-former and now-current Bad Religion guitarist Brett Gurewitz), who released the band's second album, Ignition, in 1992.

In April 1994, The Offspring released Smash. At the time, Ignition had sold only 15,000 copies. Smash was a critically acclaimed album, also the band's most successful yet. Debuting at number four on the Billboard 200, Smash produced three hit singles: "Come Out and Play", "Self Esteem" and "Gotta Get Away". The album was certified 6 times platinum and sold over eleven million worldwide. With sales continuing  years after its release, Smash has become Epitaph's best-selling album of all time and the highest-selling independent album of all time. "Come Out and Play" was the band's breakthrough single, topping the US Modern Rock Tracks chart, and it became the band's biggest hit from the album in the US, while "Self Esteem" was the biggest hit from the album outside of the US.

After the release of Smash, The Offspring left Epitaph and signed a record deal with Columbia Records. The year 1997 saw the release of The Offspring's major-label debut, Ixnay on the Hombre. Although not as successful as Smash, Ixnay sold over three million copies. In the following year, the band released its next album, Americana, which debuted at number two of the U.S charts, and produced three of the band's biggest hits: "Pretty Fly (for a White Guy)", "Why Don't You Get a Job?" and "The Kids Aren't Alright" making the album the peak of The Offspring's mainstream popularity.

In 2000, the band released its sixth album, Conspiracy of One. They intended to release the entire album online through the band's official website, to show support for downloading music on the Internet. However, under threat of legal action by Columbia through its parent company, Sony, only the first single, "Original Prankster", was released on the website (the rest of the record was leaked to fan sites).

While working on a followup to Conspiracy of One, longtime drummer Ron Welty left the band in early 2003 to concentrate on his new project Steady Ground. Soon after, the band released its next album, Splinter, which spawned the band's second number one on Alternative Songs. Uncomfortable with the idea of finding an immediate replacement for Welty, The Offspring opted to have session musician Josh Freese record the drums for Splinter, and later announced that Atom Willard would be the official replacement for Ron Welty. The album's original title was to be Chinese Democrazy, a name used to mock the name of the long-delayed album by Guns N' Roses. As a result, Axl Rose filed a cease and desist order against The Offspring. However, the order was dropped when it was realized that the announcement of the album's name came on April 1 (April Fools' Day).

The year 2005 saw the release of the band's first compilation album, Greatest Hits. It contains 13 of the band's hits between Smash and Splinter and two previously unreleased songs: lead single "Can't Repeat" and a hidden track, "Next to You" (originally by the Police). The compilation does not contain any material from the first album or Ignition. In support of the Greatest Hits album, the band played the Vans Warped Tour for the first time, and a tour in Europe and Japan followed.

After the Greatest Hits tour, The Offspring took an extended hiatus and Willard left the band in July 2007 to concentrate on his current project Angels & Airwaves. He was replaced by former Face to Face drummer Pete Parada. The band's eighth studio album, Rise and Fall, Rage and Grace, was released on June 17, 2008, but Parada did not record it due to contract issues. The band tapped Freese again to record the drum tracks. Second single "You're Gonna Go Far, Kid" went Gold in the US and became their third number one on Billboard Alternative Songs. The next album, Days Go By, was released four years later; this time, the drum tracks were handled by both Freese and Parada, making this his first recording with the band. After touring and playing festivals in support of the album and twenty years of Smash, single "Coming for You" was released in 2015 and became the band's second Billboard Mainstream Rock number one.

As of 2015, The Offspring has sold over 40 million albums worldwide. According to Nielsen SoundScan, they have sold almost 17 million albums in the United States and 4.2 million tracks, of which 15 million are certified by the Recording Industry Association of America (RIAA).

Albums

Studio albums

Compilation albums

Demo albums

Other appearances

EPs

Songs

Singles

A These songs were not released commercially as singles in the U.S., and therefore, did not chart on the Billboard Hot 100 chart.  (Before December 5, 1998, songs were not eligible to enter the Hot 100 unless they were commercially available as a single.)  However, they charted on the Hot 100 Airplay chart.
B "The Kids Aren't Alright" did not chart on the Billboard Hot 100 chart but peaked on the Bubbling Under Hot 100 Singles chart at number 5.
C "(Can't Get My) Head Around You" did not chart on the Billboard Hot 100 chart but peaked on the Bubbling Under Hot 100 Singles chart at number 20.
D "Can't Repeat" did not chart on the Billboard Hot 100 chart but peaked on the Bubbling Under Hot 100 Singles chart at number 10.
E "Hammerhead" did not chart on the Billboard Hot 100 chart but peaked on the Bubbling Under Hot 100 Singles chart at number 5.
F "Kristy, Are You Doing Okay?" did not chart on the Billboard Hot 100 chart but peaked on the Bubbling Under Hot 100 Singles chart at number 6.
G "Days Go By" did not chart on the Billboard Hot 100 chart but peaked on the Bubbling Under Hot 100 Singles chart at number 17.

Soundtrack contributions

Non-album songs

Cover tracks

Videos

Video albums

Music videos

See also
List of songs recorded by The Offspring

References

External links
 Official band website
 The Offspring discography at AllMusic
 
 

Discography
Discographies of American artists
Pop punk group discographies